Songbook is the first album from Auckland band The Nudie Suits. It was recorded between 1999 and 2000 on a Fostex R8 8-track recorder in St. Kevins Arcade, Auckland.

Track listing

"Up The Buhi" – 2:56
"Travellin' Library" – 3:24
"Hasten Down To Music City" – 3:05
"Holy Ghost (In Back Of You)" – 3:48
"You've Been Doctored" – 2:51
"(Dancing Like A) Hustable" – 3:48
"Look Out Djuna" – 3:03
"Those Blows" – 3:04
"Little Too Loose There" – 2:11
"Let The Party Go On" – 3:39
"Hey Bony" – 2:11
"Who'll Stop Pop" – 4:19

Personnel
Mark Lyons – vocals, acoustic guitar, ukulele, electric guitar, piano, percussion, harmonica
Dionne Taylor – Hawaiian steel guitar, harmony vocals, autoharp
Tam Taylor – violin
Malcolm Deans – drums
Paul Mortenson – bass, harmony vocals, piano
Ricky McShane – drums
Jonnathan Bree – bass

External links
Lil' Chief Records: The Nudie Suits
The Nudie Suits on MySpace
Lil' Chief Records

2003 albums
The Nudie Suits albums
Lil' Chief Records albums